The Patriotic Old Comrades' League (POCL) was a political party in Myanmar.

History
The POCL was formed by a group of former army members and veteran politicians at the height of the 8888 Uprising, and was a sister party of the National League for Democracy. It contested three seats in the 1990 general elections, winning one – Hla Maung in Kya-in-Seikkyi in Karen State.

The party was banned by the military government on 11 March 1992.

References

Defunct political parties in Myanmar
1988 establishments in Burma
Political parties established in 1988
1992 disestablishments in Myanmar
Political parties disestablished in 1992